Youth leadership is the practice of teens exercising authority over themselves or others.

Youth leadership has been elaborated upon as a theory of youth development in which young people gain skills and knowledge necessary to lead civic engagement, education reform and community organizing activities. Countless programs around the world seek to teach young people particular skills associated with leadership, particularly those programs associate with youth voice or youth empowerment. According to the study, it should increase the capacity of both individuals and communities.

See also
Youth voice
Youth rights

Examples
4-H
AIESEC International
Air Training Corps
Amigos de las Americas
Bangladesh Youth Leadership Center
Boys & Girls Clubs of America
Boy Scouts of America
Congressional Youth Leadership Council
Girl Scouts of the USA
Global Leadership Adventures
Halogen Foundation
Junior Reserve Officers' Training Corps
National Hispanic Institute
National Youth Leadership Council
National Youth Leadership Training (BSA)
Oaktree
Palestinian Youth Association for Leadership and Rights Activation
Red Cross Youth
Rotary Youth Leadership Awards
Spirit of Enniskillen Trust
Student Catholic Action
Toastmasters International
UpRising
White Stag Leadership Development Program (BSA)
World Association of Girl Guides and Girl Scouts
World Organization of the Scout Movement
WYSE International
Young Foundation
Young India Foundation
Youth Parliament Program

References

Student culture
Strategic management
Positions of authority
Youth work